Marin Teodorescu (March 8, 1896, Pitești – January 13, 1945, Bucharest), known as Zavaidoc, was a Romanian singer, the country's best known lăutar in the interwar period. Born in Pitești into a family of lăutari, he made his way to Bucharest as a youth, together with his taraf partner. He released his first disc with Columbia Records in 1925, meeting with instant success. He died two decades later and was buried at Cernica.

Notes

1896 births
1945 deaths
People from Pitești
Lăutari and lăutărească music
20th-century Romanian male singers
20th-century Romanian singers